Mao Zhiyong (November 1929 – 4 March 2019) was a People's Republic of China politician. He was born in Yueyang, Hunan. He was Chinese Communist Party Committee Secretary (1977–1988), governor (1977–1979) and Chinese People's Political Consultative Conference Committee Chairman (1977–1979) of his home province. He was Chinese Communist Party Committee Secretary of Jiangxi (1988–1995).

References

1929 births
2019 deaths
People's Republic of China politicians from Hunan
Chinese Communist Party politicians from Hunan
Governors of Hunan
Politicians from Yueyang
Academic staff of Hunan Agricultural University
Vice Chairpersons of the National Committee of the Chinese People's Political Consultative Conference